Anjarle is a village in the Dapoli taluka of Ratnagiri district in the Maharashtra state of India. The nearest railway station is Khed,  to the southeast.

Tourism facilities are limited.

History
The origins of Anjarle are connected with the settlement of Brahmins at Anjarle and at two other nearby villages which no longer exist. The Kadyavarcha Ganapati temple was established in the 11th or 12th century.

Geography
It has an average elevation of 10 metres (36 feet). 
As part of the Western Ghats, the forests are evergreen, consisting mainly of tropical forest. Alphonso mangoes and coconuts are grown commercially in this area.

Transport
Anjarle is connected to Dapoli, the closest town, by MSRTC buses, private taxis and autorickshaws.

State Transport buses run at an interval of 30–60 minutes. Buses start from Dapoli ST depot and drop passengers at Anjarle creek. In addition, private transport jeeps and rickshaws run between Dapoli and Anjarle.

Anjarle is connected to the nearest road by a bridge on a creek nearby, which is known as the Anjarle creek. One can also ferry across the creek and carry own's car in it, which was basically the only route in days before the bridge was built.

Kadyawarcha Ganpati
Anjarle is known for the  temple (Marathi: Ganapati on a cliff). This temple was originally constructed using wooden pillars ca. 1150. It was renovated between 1768 and 1780. Until the recent construction of bridge across the Anjarle creek and the building of a road up to the temple, pilgrims had to cross Anjarle creek (Jog River) in a boat, before climbing the hill using steps which pass through Anjarle village.

The idol at this temple differs from most other representations of the elephant-headed god, in that its trunk curves right, rather than the usual left. The temple has a stone staircase on the right to reach the top of the temple (the ), which has a commanding view of  the surrounding coconut and betel nut trees, the nearby Suvarnadurg Fort, the Arabian sea and surrounding hills. There is a pond in front of the temple where visitors can feed large fish and turtles. Beside the temple to Ganesh is a small temple to Shiva.

There are many rumors about the origins of this temple, but unfortunately there is no evidence to shed a light on it. Many fables claim the temple's creation traces back to the 12th century, and the old structure of the temple was made completely out of wood. The temple's administration has been with the ‘Nitsure’ family from the year 1630. As per the fables, this temple was at the seashore in the ancient days. The same seashore was home to two other temples of Ajayrayleshwar and Siddhivinayak.

Products
Ajarle is known for producing Alphanso mangoes and cashew nuts, which are available from April through May.

Industries
The economy of the Anjarle village revolves around agriculture, travel and tourism, food processing (canning of mango pulp).

Festivals
From February to May, Anjarle hosts a festival called the Turtle Festival, where young hatchlings of olive ridley sea turtles are released back into the ocean.
During January and February (during the Hindu month of Magh) a festival of Ganapati is celebrated at Kadyavaril Ganapati temple. In March, Ajarle holds a Holi festival at which the game  is played.  Jatra is held at Durga temple in April and May.  Ganpati is held in September.
Ram Navami is also celebrated on a large scale.

References

Villages in Ratnagiri district